Marie-Josée Bazin (born 3 May 1952) is a French archer. She competed in the women's individual and team events at the 1988 Summer Olympics.

References

1952 births
Living people
French female archers
Olympic archers of France
Archers at the 1988 Summer Olympics
Sportspeople from Avignon